The Reaping is a 2007 American supernatural horror thriller film, starring Hilary Swank. The film was directed by Stephen Hopkins for Warner Bros. Pictures, Village Roadshow Pictures and Dark Castle Entertainment. The music for the film was scored by John Frizzell.

Plot
Katherine Winter and colleague Ben investigate claims of miracles. On an expedition to the city of Concepción, Chile, they investigate claims that the corpse of a priest who has been dead for 40 years remains in pristine condition. Eventually they discover that toxic waste helped preserve the body.

In Louisiana, Katherine receives a call from a friend, Father Michael Costigan, who says that his photographs of her have developed burn marks that when assembled, form a sickle-like symbol "ㄜ", a possible warning from God, which she ignores. She meets Doug Blackwell, a teacher from the nearby town of Haven, who asks Katherine to find out why Haven's river has turned red. The locals believe this is a biblical plague caused by a girl, Loren McConnell, who they believe killed her older brother in the river.

They travel to Haven, where Katherine sees the river is indeed entirely red. Katherine and Doug come across ruins of an old church, which Doug explains was destroyed one hundred years ago by several hurricanes, forcing the entire town to relocate. Meanwhile, Ben witnesses dead frogs seemingly fall from the sky. Doug invites them to spend the night at his house, where he reveals he comes from a long line of only children. That night, their dinner becomes rotted with flies instantly.

Katherine and Ben get a call asking them to come to a nearby farm, where they find that the cows are dying of an unknown disease. Ben begins to question whether the events could actually have biblical causes, but Katherine remains unconvinced. The owner of the farm tells them that the McConnell family have been visited by people who appear to be Satan worshippers, and that he saw evidence of a religious sacrifice. Later that evening, Katherine tells Doug why she left the church; five years ago, she was an ordained minister. While doing missionary work in the Sudan with her husband and daughter, the locals sacrificed her family, believing they caused a drought. Katherine then has intense dreams that she and Doug have sex.

Katherine goes to talk to Loren. Loren remains silent the whole time. Katherine notices that her leg is soaked in menstrual blood. Katherine helps clean her up and has a vision of Loren turning the river red. Loren's mother appears, asking if Katherine is there to kill Loren. Before she can explain, Loren attacks her and Katherine runs away. Ben and Katherine examine Loren's brother's body, finding the sickle-like symbol branded into his lower back. Test results prove the river contains human blood. The citizens, meanwhile, are shaving their children's heads, due to an outbreak of lice. Ben and Doug try to get the mayor to evacuate the town, but he and his staff are killed with boils.

A posse gathers to kill Loren to try to stop the plagues. Katherine calls Father Costigan, who explains that he has researched a satanic cult which sacrifices every second-born child once they reach puberty to create a "perfect child with the eyes of the Devil" to bring them power. He believes that Loren is the devil child. He also states that an angel, who cannot be harmed by the cult, will destroy them. He insists that Katherine is the angel, as the term is sometimes used to mean servants of God. At that moment, a supernatural force burns Costigan's room, killing him. Katherine returns to the McConnell house, where she finds the cult's sacrificial chamber. There, Loren's mother says that Loren is "his servant" now, then kills herself. Outside, Katherine finds locusts everywhere. As the townspeople arrive and prepare to kill Loren, the locusts attack and kill the posse. Doug runs away and falls into the river. Katherine locks herself in the house and Ben hides in a crypt, where he discovers skeletons and bodies of sacrificed children. He calls Katherine when Loren appears outside.

Katherine finds Ben dead. She confronts Loren as darkness falls and fiery hail and thunder rains from the sky. Katherine is about to kill Loren, when suddenly she says something that Katherine told her own daughter in Sudan. Katherine asks how she can tell what is real. Loren answers "faith", and shows her a vision of the truth. The cult, which actually encompasses the entire town and Doug, are shown trying to kill Loren since she has reached puberty. Loren escaped and her brother Brody stabbed her, but her wound miraculously healed, and Brody died. Katherine realizes that Loren is the angel God sent. She also sees that Doug killed Ben. The townsfolk surround them as Doug tells her that only an ordained servant of God can kill Loren. He reveals that his family recruited the entire town into the satanic cult, as the hurricanes that destroyed the old church led them to believe that God had abandoned them. He invited Katherine to investigate the plagues because they hoped she would join them, since she had turned her back on God. Katherine refuses. A sudden fire then rains down on the town, killing the satanists, who all happened to be first-born. Doug grabs Katherine as he is being lifted off the ground and killed, with Katherine being spared.

As Katherine drives Loren away, Loren reveals that Katherine is pregnant.  Since this is her second child, Katherine realizes that her unborn son,  fathered by Doug, is the prophesied demonic child.

Cast

Production
Filming for the movie took place in and around Baton Rouge, Louisiana with many scenes shot in an abandoned WalMart store. Swank convinced the producers to move the film's setting from New England to Louisiana. When Hurricane Katrina occurred midshoot (August 26, 2005), the production of the film was suspended for one week. Many scenes were shot at Ellerslie Plantation near St. Francisville, Louisiana. The DVD special features record that the producers considered shooting in another city, but decided that Louisiana needed the economic benefit of the movie being shot there.

Before and during the making of the movie, skeptic investigator Joe Nickell was consulted. The type of skeptical investigations by the movie's main character in the first part of the movie is roughly based on Nickell's investigations of claims of the paranormal since 1969.

The film was originally scheduled to play in theaters on August 5, 2006, then November 5, 2006; it was then switched to March 30, 2007, (the date featured on the above poster), then April 6, 2007, and then to April 5, 2007. It was finally released on April 5, 2007, to coincide with Holy Thursday.

Release

Box office
The Reaping opened in 2,603 theaters and earned $10,025,203 in its opening weekend. The film grossed $25,126,214 in the United States Box Office and $62,771,059 worldwide.

Score

The score was originally written by Philip Glass, and went as far as the recording; however, the producers were not completely satisfied and decided to give it another try. John Frizzell was then brought in to compose a new score.

Reception
The aggregate site Rotten Tomatoes gives the film an approval rating of 8% based on 134 reviews, and an average rating of 3.49/10, with the consensus stating: "It may feature such accomplished actors as Hilary Swank and Stephen Rea, but The Reaping also boasts the apropos tagline "What hath God wrought?". It's schlocky, spiritually shallow, and scare-free."

Controversy
Jacqueline Van Rysselberghe, the Mayor of Concepción, Chile, formally objected to the producers of the film over its portrayal of the city in the opening scene. She pointed out that rather than being the dirty underdeveloped tropical city as shown in the movie, Concepción is an industrialized city with many universities and was surprised that such inadequate research of the setting had been carried out for a high budget movie.

References

External links
 
 
 
 
 
 

2007 films
2007 horror films
American supernatural horror films
Dark Castle Entertainment films
2000s English-language films
Films about the ten plagues of Egypt
Films directed by Stephen Hopkins
Films produced by Joel Silver
Films scored by John Frizzell (composer)
Films set in Louisiana
Films shot in New Orleans
Religious horror films
Village Roadshow Pictures films
Warner Bros. films
Films produced by Robert Zemeckis
2000s American films